The 2003 Big South Conference men's basketball tournament took place March 4–8, 2003, at campus sites. The tournament was won by the UNC Asheville Bulldogs, their first tournament championship, as well as first under head coach Eddie Biedenbach.

Format
All eight teams participated in the tournament. Teams were seeded by conference winning percentage. For the quarterfinals, all games were hosted at campus sites, with home-field advantage going to the higher seed, while the semifinals and finals were played at the Vines Center in Lynchburg, Virginia, the home of Liberty University. This was the last year for Elon as a member of the Big South.

Bracket

* Asterisk indicates overtime game

All-Tournament Team
Andre Smith, UNC Asheville
Alex Kragel, UNC Asheville
Ryan McCullough, UNC Asheville
Ben McGonagil, UNC Asheville
Raymond Arrington, Radford

References

Tournament
Big South Conference men's basketball tournament
Big South Conference men's basketball tournament
Big South Conference men's basketball tournament